The Cristo de La Laguna (Christ of La Laguna in English) is a Catholic figure of great historical, artistic and cultural image that represents the crucified Jesus of Nazareth. Situated in the Real Santuario del Santísimo Cristo de La Laguna (Royal Sanctuary of the Christ), in city of San Cristóbal de La Laguna (Tenerife, Canary Islands, Spain).

It is the image that represents Jesus most revered and important of the Canary Islands, the image procession at Easter and September 14 to the Cathedral of La Laguna where he remained until a few days after returning to her shrine, which is visited daily. This work is one of the best ones that are part of the historical heritage of the Canary Islands. It is one of the Spanish religious sculptures of the highest artistic value. He is also considered one of the best European crucified in terms of artistic quality.

History
There are many theories on the origin of the figure of Christ. It was Professor Joaquin Yarza who assumed that its origins were northern European, although he did not deny its Sevillian origins. The latest studies conducted by Professor Francisco Galante Gomez confirm that the figure came from the flourishing workshops of Antwerp, thus making it of Flemish-Brabanzon origin, and it was sculpted by Louis Van Der Vule around 1514.

It is claimed that the Santisimo Cristo went to Venice before coming to Tenerife, as the city was a major trading and economic centre at the time. From there, it was taken to Barcelona and from Barcelona to Cádiz, where it was given temporary accommodation in the church of La Vera Cruz in Sanlúcar de Barrameda. After finally come to Tenerife in 1520.

Over the centuries, the solemn worship of this image of Christ has made it one of the most venerated religious images in the entire archipelago. This image has been taken in rogatives through the streets of the city in multitude of occasions throughout the history, generally to ask for its intercession in diverse public calamities like epidemics, plagues or droughts that were produced in the island of Tenerife.

Before the image of the Christ of La Laguna received the episcopal consecration Monsignor Domingo Pérez Cáceres, September 21, 1947, that became the first bishop born in Tenerife that governed his own native diocese. The image of the Christ had been exceptionally transferred to the Cathedral of La Laguna for such occasion a few days before.

The church of the christ is currently classified as a Royal Sanctuary, and is highly popular with church goers. It was returned to the Franciscan community of the annex to the Convent of San Miguel de las Victorias. The church of the christ in the course of history was enriched by the Popes pardons that are granted to the Basilica of St. John Lateran in Rome. The "Real Santuario del Santísimo Cristo de La Laguna" was listed as a Cultural Monument in 2005 by the Canary Islands Government.

Legends about its origin
There are alternatives legends that attempt to explain the origin of this enigmatic sculpture. Some of these legends say that the image of Christ of La Laguna was sculpted by angels and even by the Evangelist Saint Luke. Fray Luís de Quirós said the image of Christ of La Laguna was taken to the island of Tenerife by Saint Michael Archangel. In both cases these "holy sculptors" sculpted image with facial features that had Jesus Christ at the time of his crucifixion.

Another legend tells that a stormy night the religious from the Convent of San Miguel de las Victorias (today Sanctuary of Christ) felt knocking the door, and when they opened it found a large box, the bright lights inside out. After opening the box found in the image of Christ, this fact was taken as a miracle.

Brotherhood of Cristo de La Laguna
From the image of Christ is responsible for a fraternity or sorority is the largest of the Canary Islands, call: Pontificia, Real y Venerable Esclavitud del Santísimo Cristo de La Laguna. The Spanish King Alfonso XIII to this brotherhood Awarded the title of "Royal" on 19 December 1906, and Pope Pius X gave him the title of "Pontifical" on 15 February 1908.

Gallery

See also
List of statues of Jesus
San Cristóbal de La Laguna
Real Santuario del Santísimo Cristo de La Laguna
Virgin of Candelaria

References

External links
Real, Pontificia y Venerable Esclavitud del Santísimo Cristo de La Laguna: Official Site of the Brotherhood of Cristo de La Laguna
Sanctuary del Cristo (La Laguna)

Statues of Jesus
Catholic Church in the Canary Islands
San Cristóbal de La Laguna